David Gems FRS is a pre-eminent British geneticist who has focused on research into ageing and age-related disease over the last 40 years. He is Professor of Biology of Ageing at University College London where he is also co-founder and Research Director of the Institute of Healthy Ageing. His work concerns understanding aging through the genetics of C. elegans.

References

External links
Blue death: The frontiers of ageing research Video in which Gems discusses his work
David Gems Profile, Gems Laboratory

Biogerontologists
1960 births
Living people
Alumni of the University of Sussex
British geneticists
Academics of University College London